William H. Todd (1864-1932) was a shipbuilder and an avid philanthropist.

He was born on November 27, 1864, the son of a boilermaker in Wilmington, Delaware.  He apprenticed to be a shipwright at the Pusey and Jones Shipyard in Wilmington as a young man and moved to  Brooklyn, New York in 1893 to work in the Brooklyn Navy Yard.  He left the Navy Yard in 1896, to become foreman of the Robins Dry Dock & Repair Company of Erie Basin. He eventually became president of Robins.

He died May 15, 1932.

Legacy
 Todd Square, a park in at the intersection of Columbia Street and Halleck Street in Brooklyn, New York
 Todd Shipyard Company, now Vigor Shipyards
 Todd Shipyards (soccer) team he supported.
 Liberty ship

References

American shipbuilders
1864 births
1932 deaths
American shipwrights